Francis Reiss (1927 – 4 December 2017) was an Australian photographer, born to Danish parents in Hamburg, Germany. He was best known for his work for Picture Post and Life magazines.

Early life
Reiss was born in 1927 in Hamburg, Germany to Danish parents. He began taking photos as a child. The family moved to the United Kingdom in 1936. There he attended Oundle School, and began taking photos.

Career and death
Reiss began working for Picture Post magazine in the UK at the age of 17, the youngest staff photographer employed by them. Picture Post published over 60 picture stories by him.

In 1947, Reiss sailed for New York and immediately started working extensively for LIFE magazine.

In 1950, realising he had gone stale  Reiss quit photography, and entered the wool trade.

Not until 1993, ten years after migrating to Australia  and  receiving a chance commission from James Mollison did he return to photography.

Reiss died on 4 December 2017 at the age of 90.

Collections
His works are held in a number of collections:
 State Library of Victoria
 National Library of Australia
 National Portrait Gallery (Australia)
 Jewish Museum of Australia
 National Gallery of Victoria
 Monash Gallery of Art
 Mitchell Library (Australia)
 Heide Museum of Modern Art
 City of Whitehorse art collection

Exhibitions
His work has been exhibited at a number of galleries in Australia, including one-man shows at:
 Bendigo Art Gallery
 Monash Gallery of Art
 Whitehorse Art Space  
and in group exhibitions at:
 Barbican Centre

Publications
His work has appeared in the following publications:
 Journal of Mediterranean Archaeology
 Overland magazine
 Bystander magazine

References

English photojournalists
Australian photojournalists
Picture Post photojournalists
English people of Danish descent
Australian people of Danish descent
British emigrants to Australia
1927 births
2017 deaths